Scorpions Revisited is a studio album by Uli Jon Roth released on 9 February 2015.  The guitarist revisited his personal favourites from the early Scorpions period. The album was produced by German producer Sascha Paeth.

Track listing

Musicians 
Uli Jon Roth - Lead guitar
Nathan James - Vocals
Liz Vandall - Vocals
Jamie Little - Drums
Ule W. Ritgen - Bass
Niklas Turmann - Guitar, vocals
Corvin Bahn - Keyboards, vocals
David Klosinski - Guitar

References

External links
zrockr.com review of Scorpions revisited
UDR Music official Page for Scorpions Revisited

2015 albums
Uli Jon Roth albums